Heath Hayes and Wimblebury are two villages which now form a civil parish in the Cannock Chase District of Staffordshire, England. The area has excellent transport links, being close to the strategic transport network via the M6, M6 Toll and A5, and also easy access to both Hednesford and Cannock train stations.  There are a number of good schools in the area and also a great choice of leisure and retail facilities with the recently developed McArthur Glen Designer Outlet West Midlands.  These, along with the excess of open spaces, being situated directly next to Cannock Chase Area of Outstanding Natural Beauty (AONB), mean that the area remains a popular choice for commuters and families and is one of the most affluent areas in the district.

Significant recent housing development in Heath Hayes has meant that the status of the area has consequently changed from a small village to a larger village with a great population.

Wimblebury however still remains a picturesque small village, although there have been several new housing developments which now link the village to neighbouring Heath Hayes and also Hednesford.  It is though still surrounded on three sides by an excess of green spaces / green belt - notably the Old Brickworks nature reserve, the Hednesford hills nature reserve (which is an area of Special Scientific Interest), Wimblebury Mound (known locally as Cannel Mount) and Bleak House farm, with the village bordering the Cannock Chase Area of Outstanding Natural Beauty (AONB).

Demographics
In the decade to 2011 the number of dwellings rose by 17.4% to 5,515.

Of the parish's 5,515 households in the 2011 census, 21.4% were one-person households including 6.3% where that person was 65 or over. 74.6% were one family with no others (4.7% all pensioners, 46.6% married or same-sex civil partnership couples, 14.8% cohabiting couples and 8.6% lone parents). 38.7% of households had dependent children including 2.8% with no adults in employment. 76.7% of households owned their homes outright or with a mortgage or loan.

Of the parish's 11,079 residents in the 2011 census aged 16 and over, 31.9% were single (never married), 52.5% married, 0.15% in a registered same-sex civil partnership, 2.4% separated, 8.3% divorced and 4.7% widowed. 19.2% had no formal qualifications and 57.6% had level 2+ qualifications (meaning 5+ GCSEs (grades A*-C) or 1+ 'A' levels/ AS levels (A-E) or equivalent minimum).

85.0% of the 5,232 men aged 16 to 74 were economically active, including 58.7% working full-time, 4.6% working part-time and 15.2% self-employed. The male unemployment rate (of those economically active) was 4.7%.
75.1% of the 5,294 women aged 16 to 74 were economically active, including 37.6% working full-time, 26.8% working part-time and 4.3% self-employed. The female unemployment rate (of those economically active) was 3.7%.

Of people in employment aged 16 to 74, 13.8% worked in basic industries (ONS categories A, B, and D-F including 12.1% in construction), 12.8% in manufacturing, and 73.3% in service industries (ONS categories G-U including 18.5% in wholesale and retail trade and vehicle repair, 11.7% in health and social work, 8.6% in education, 6.5% in public administration, 5.6% in transport and storage, 4.0% in accommodation and catering, 4.0% in professional, scientific and technical activities, and 3.8% in administrative and support service activities). Only 10.8% of households did not have access to a car or van, and 85.6% of people in employment travelled to work by car or van.

85.6% of residents described their health as good or very good. The proportion who described themselves as White British was 96.3%, with all white ethnic groups making up 97.4% of the population. The ethnic make-up of the rest of the population was 0.87% mixed/multiple ethnic groups, 0.65% Indian/Pakistani/Bangladeshi, 0.24% Chinese, 0.31% other Asian, 0.36% Black and 0.16% other. 2.5% of the parish's residents were born outside the United Kingdom.

The responses to the voluntary question "What is your religion?" were 'No religion' (22.8%), Christian (69.8%), Buddhist (0.22%), Hindu (0.10%), Jewish (0%), Muslim (0.18%), Sikh (0.35%), and other religion (0.35%). 6.1% gave no answer.

Notable people 
 Mel Galley (1948 in Cannock – 2008 in Heath Hayes and Wimblebury) an English guitarist and singer, best known for his work with Whitesnake, Trapeze, Finders Keepers and Phenomena.

See also
Listed buildings in Heath Hayes and Wimblebury

References

External links
Heath Hayes & Wimblebury Parish Council

Cannock Chase District
Villages in Staffordshire
Civil parishes in Staffordshire